Following is a list of past and present Members of Parliament (MPs) of the Parliament of the United Kingdom whose surnames begin with Y.

Colour key:       

 Y